The Clarinda Carnegie Library, now known as the Clarinda Carnegie Art Museum, is a historic building located in Clarinda, Iowa, United States.  The Clarinda Public Library was organized in 1905.   The library board applied for a grant from the Carnegie Corporation of New York for $15,000 on February 21, 1907.  W.W. Welch was the architect of the Carnegie library building that was dedicated on April 15, 1909.  In time the building became too small.  The Lied Foundation of Las Vegas donated $1 million towards a new facility, and a special election held in October 2002 allowed the city to borrow the same amount for a new building. Groundbreaking for the new building took place on May 28, 2003, and the new Lied Public Library was opened on October 11, 2004.  The old library building has been transformed into an art museum, and it was listed on the National Register of Historic Places in 2014.

References

External links
 Clarinda Carnegie Art Museum

Library buildings completed in 1909
Neoclassical architecture in Iowa
Carnegie libraries in Iowa
National Register of Historic Places in Page County, Iowa
Libraries on the National Register of Historic Places in Iowa
Museums in Page County, Iowa
Art museums and galleries in Iowa